

Fossils
 Robert Plot, the first illustrator of a dinosaur bone, dies in Borden, Kent, the village where he was born.

References

17th century in paleontology
Paleontology